Verve is a studio album by Sebastian Plano. The album received a Grammy Award nomination for Best New Age Album.

References 

2019 albums
New-age albums